Robenval Benvindo dos Santos (born March 14, 1985 in Aracaju), is a Brazilian footballer who is currently playing for Caldense.

References

External links
 rubronegro
 rubronegro

1985 births
Living people
Brazilian footballers
Club Athletico Paranaense players
Clube Atlético Bragantino players
Rio Branco Sport Club players
Association football defenders
People from Aracaju
Sportspeople from Sergipe